Julia Margaret Deakin (born 20 May 1952) is an English actress. She is known for her roles in the sitcoms So Haunt Me (1992–1994), Oh Doctor Beeching! (1996–1997) and Spaced (1999–2001). Her film appearances include Shaun of the Dead (2004), Hot Fuzz (2007) and High-Rise (2015).

Early life
Deakin was born in Gainsborough, Lincolnshire, where her parents Wyn and Bill were shopkeepers.

She attended Gainsborough High School for Girls (became part of Queen Elizabeth's High School in 1983), a girls' grammar school. She started French and Drama teacher training near Manchester, then attended Mountview Theatre School.

Career
In theatre, she has played Mrs. Sowerberry in the West End cast of Oliver!, singing the song "That's Your Funeral" with David Delve on a recording.

On television, Deakin played Stella Tulley in Side by Side and Marsha, the ageing divorcée landlady, in the sitcom Spaced (1999).

Deakin earlier appeared in the television sitcom Oh, Doctor Beeching! (1996–1997), where she played the role of May Skinner, replacing Sherrie Hewson from the original pilot. She has also made many single television appearances, including playing Jill, the receptionist from Pear Tree Productions, in one episode of the first series of I'm Alan Partridge, a rural dominatrix in Doc Martin as well as roles in Midsomer Murders and Coronation Street. She appeared in the sketch comedy series Big Train alongside fellow Spaced cast members Simon Pegg and Mark Heap. She plays Dr. Jean in the Alan segments on Modern Toss.  She played Luella's mother, Genevieve Shakespeare in "The Envious Court", Shakespeare & Hathaway: Private Investigators S2:E9 (2019).

She has appeared on radio, as Eva Tattle in The Maltby Collection. She also guest starred in the Doctor Who audio drama Terror Firma for Big Finish Productions. And appeared in an episode of Agatha Raisin with Penelope Keith.

She portrayed Daphne Andrews in House of Anubis. Her character left in series two.

Film
Deakin had a cameo in the feature film Shaun of the Dead (2004) and played the pub landlady Mary Porter in the film Hot Fuzz (2007) by Simon Pegg and Edgar Wright. In 2009 she was cast as Maggie, a Brighton mother in Ben Wheatley's British crime film Down Terrace. She later appeared in Ben Wheatley's 2015 cinema adaptation of High-Rise as Jean, the assistant to protagonist Dr. Laing.

Personal life
She is married to actor and author Michael Simkins.

Filmography

Television roles

Film roles

References

External links
 
 More about her character in Spaced

1952 births
Actresses from Lincolnshire
Alumni of the Mountview Academy of Theatre Arts
English television actresses
Living people
People educated at Queen Elizabeth's High School
People from Gainsborough, Lincolnshire
20th-century English actresses
21st-century English actresses